Virgil Andrei Drăghia (born 31 July 1990) is a Romanian professional footballer who plays as a goalkeeper for Liga I club Rapid București.

Honours
Rapid București
Liga II: 2015–16

Liga III: 2018–19

References

External links

1989 births
Living people
Footballers from Bucharest
Romanian footballers
Association football goalkeepers
Romania under-21 international footballers
Liga I players
Liga II players
FC Rapid București players
CS Concordia Chiajna players
ASC Daco-Getica București players
FC Voluntari players